Edward Thaddeus "Tad" Foote II (December 15, 1937 – February 15, 2016) was an American academic administrator, attorney, and journalist who served as the fourth president of the University of Miami from 1981 through 2001.

Early life and education 
A native of Milwaukee, Foote graduated from John Burroughs School in St. Louis. He earned a bachelor's degree from Yale University and a law degree from Georgetown University Law Center.

Career 
Foote served as dean of the Washington University School of Law at Washington University in St. Louis from 1973 to 1980.

University of Miami

In March 1981, Foote succeeded Henry King Stanford as the fourth University of Miami president.

During Foote's tenure, undergraduate admissions and academic standards were raised, top faculty recruited, and major private and government funding secured for research and permanent facilities. The increase in the University's local, national and international profile paralleled the rise of Miami as the so-called "Capital of the Americas".

Foote's tenure as University of Miami president included a capital fundraising campaign that was the second-largest in the history of American higher education at the time, raising $517.5 million; purchasing or constructing nearly 50 buildings; and bolstering the academic quality of admitted students. In 1982, Foote pared undergraduate enrollment by 2,500 to 8,500, raising standards for admissions and improving retention and graduation rates by targeting a smaller but more selective student body. 

By fall 2000, entering students had an average SAT score of 1200, about 100 points higher than the class of 1981. Today, the university's mean SAT score is 1315.

Foote also launched a steadily-increasing amount of sponsored research conducted by University of Miami professors and scientists. In 2000, $193.9 million was spent on research, up from $58.1 million, in 1981. Foote also created three new colleges, the School of Architecture, the School of Communication, and the Graduate School of International Studies, and increased the number of full-time faculty members by 560, and championed the university's athletic program. Under him, the University of Miami won four national championships in football and three College World Series baseball titles. He also reinstated the men's basketball program.

Honors 
The University of Miami established the Foote Fellowships in honor of the University's fourth president. In 2003, Foote was elected to the Common Cause National Governing Board. Foote also was inducted into the Iron Arrow Honor Society, the highest honor bestowed by the University of Miami.

Death 
Foote died on February 15, 2016, at the age of 78 from complications of Parkinson's disease at East Ridge nursing facility in Cutler Bay, Florida. Former University of Miami president Donna Shalala wrote in an email, "He was a remarkable leader and a real gentleman. The University improved greatly under his tenure." The university's current president, Julio Frenk, said "President Foote’s tenure … was marked by a far-reaching and rigorous pursuit of academic excellence that helped to distinguish our students and faculty among the finest in the nation. Together with his late wife, Roberta "Bosey" Fulbright Foote, they made Miami their home, and we are a far better and stronger institution and community thanks to them."

Personal 
Foote was married to Roberta "Bosey" Fulbright Foote, who died in May 2015. She was born December 27, 1938, in Arkansas and was the daughter of the late U.S. senator, J. William Fulbright, namesake of the Fulbright scholarship. They had three children, Julia, William and Thaddeus and eight grandchildren.

References

1937 births
2016 deaths
People from Milwaukee
Presidents of the University of Miami
Washington University in St. Louis faculty
Georgetown University Law Center alumni
Yale University alumni